Oxyphil cell may refer to:
 Oxyphil cell (parathyroid)
 Oxyphil cell (pathology)